Nielsine is a given name. Notable people with the name include:

 Nielsine Nielsen (1850–1916), first female academic and physician in Denmark
 Nielsine Paget, a New Zealand homemaker and community worker
 Nielsine Petersen (1851–1916), Danish sculptor

See also
 Niels (disambiguation)
 Nielsen (disambiguation)